Dakota Business College was a small, private college in Fargo, North Dakota. It was established in 1890 by F. Leland Watkins and was still owned by the Watkins family when it finally closed in 1978.

See also 
 Masonic Block (Fargo, North Dakota)

Notes

Dakota Business College
Defunct private universities and colleges in North Dakota
Dakota Business College
Education in Fargo–Moorhead
Buildings and structures in Fargo, North Dakota
Education in Cass County, North Dakota
1890 establishments in North Dakota
Educational institutions disestablished in 1978